Tom Briehl (born September 8, 1962) is a former American football linebacker. He played for the Houston Oilers in 1985 and 1987.

References

1962 births
Living people
American football linebackers
Stanford Cardinal football players
Houston Oilers players